Mark Jooris (born February 3, 1964) is a Canadian ice hockey coach and former professional player. He most recently was the head coach of the 2011-12 Markham Waxers of the Ontario Junior Hockey League, and is currently playing amateur senior hockey with the Dundas Real McCoys in the Allan Cup Hockey.

Jooris attended Rensselaer Polytechnic Institute where he played four years (1982 - 1986) of NCAA hockey with the RPI Engineers, scoring 84 goals and 99 assists for 183 points, while earning 70 penalty minutes, in 117 games played.

Jooris went on to play 13 seasons of professional hockey, including stints in the Finnish Elite League, the American Hockey League, the German DEL and the Swiss National League A and National League B.

At the end of professional playing career, Jooris turned to coaching. Jooris served as player-coach for the amateur senior team Dundas Real McCoys from 2001-2007 before becoming assistant coach for HC Sierre in the Swiss National League B in 2007–08. He then served as an assistant scout with the St. Louis Blues of the National Hockey League during the 2008–09 season. Jooris left St. Louis for the Ontario Junior Hockey League to become head coach and general manager of the Burlington Cougars for the 2009-10 season and head coach of Oakville Blades and Markham Waxers in 2010–11 and 2011–12, respectively, while playing occasionally for the Dundas Real McCoys again.

Career statistics

Family
His son, Joshua (born July 14, 1990), is a professional hockey player formerly with the Calgary Flames organization.  He is now a member of the Carolina Hurricanes organization.

References

External links

1964 births
Living people
Ässät players
Canada men's national ice hockey team players
Canadian people of Belgian descent
Canadian ice hockey coaches
Canadian ice hockey forwards
Clarkson Golden Knights men's ice hockey coaches
Düsseldorfer EG players
Eisbären Berlin players
Genève-Servette HC players
Nova Scotia Oilers players
SC Rapperswil-Jona Lakers players
Revier Löwen players
RPI Engineers men's ice hockey players
St. Louis Blues scouts
SC Riessersee players
Springfield Indians players
Wedemark Scorpions players
Ice hockey people from Ontario
Sportspeople from Burlington, Ontario
Canadian expatriate ice hockey players in Finland
Canadian expatriate ice hockey players in Germany
Canadian expatriate ice hockey players in Switzerland
NCAA men's ice hockey national champions